Margaret Mary Sweeney (born 1955) is a senior judge of the United States Court of Federal Claims, appointed to that court in 2005 by President George W. Bush. She served as chief judge from July 12, 2018 to October 19, 2020.

Early life, education, and career
Born in Baltimore, Maryland, Sweeney received a Bachelor of Arts in history from Notre Dame of Maryland in 1977, and Juris Doctor from Delaware Law School in 1981.

Sweeney served as a Delaware Family Court Master presiding over cases involving domestic relations matters from 1981 to 1983. She then became a litigation associate from with the firm of Fedorko, Gilbert, & Lanctot, in Morrisville, Pennsylvania, until 1985, handling civil and criminal cases, including commercial litigation, personal injury, domestic relations, real property and estates. From 1985 to 1987, she served as law clerk to Loren A. Smith, Chief Judge of the United States Court of Federal Claims.

From 1987 to 2003, Sweeney served in the United States Department of Justice, first as a trial attorney in the General Litigation Section of the Environment and Natural Resources Division until 1999, and then as an Attorney Advisor for the Office of Intelligence Policy and Review. In the latter position, she prepared applications and motions on behalf of various United States intelligence agencies for presentation to the Foreign Intelligence Surveillance Court. Sweeney then served as a Special Master for the United States Court of Federal Claims from 2003 to 2005.

Federal judicial service
On October 24, 2005, Sweeney was appointed a Judge of the United States Court of Federal Claims by President George W. Bush. She was confirmed by the United States Senate and entered duty on December 14, 2005. On July 12, 2018 President Donald Trump designated her as Chief Judge. and she served in that capacity until October 19, 2020. She assumed senior status on October 23, 2020.

Memberships
Sweeney is a member of the bars of the Supreme Court of Pennsylvania and the District of Columbia Court of Appeals. In 1999, she served as President of the United States Court of Federal Claims Bar Association. Sweeney and her family reside in the Washington metropolitan area.

References

External links 

United States Court of Federal Claims page on Margaret M. Sweeney
Presidential Nomination: Margaret Mary Sweeney

1955 births
Living people
Notre Dame of Maryland University alumni
Judges of the United States Court of Federal Claims
Lawyers from Baltimore
United States Article I federal judges appointed by George W. Bush
Widener University alumni
21st-century American judges
21st-century American women judges